Essex County Council in England is elected every four years. Since the last boundary changes in 2005, 75 councillors are elected from 70 wards.

Political control

Leadership
The leaders of the council since 1997 have been:

Council elections
1973 Essex County Council election
1977 Essex County Council election
1981 Essex County Council election
1985 Essex County Council election
1989 Essex County Council election
1993 Essex County Council election
1997 Essex County Council election (loss of Thurrock and Southend reduced the number of seats by 19)
2001 Essex County Council election
2005 Essex County Council election (boundary changes reduced the number of seats by 4)
2009 Essex County Council election
2013 Essex County Council election
2017 Essex County Council election
2021 Essex County Council election

County result maps

By-election results

1985–1989
Basildon Vange (June 1986) (Labour Hold)

Gray Thurrock (July 1986) (Labour Hold)

1989–1993

1993–1997

1997–2001

2001–2005

2005–2009

2010–2013

Percentage changes are since June 2009. At the previous election, the Green Party had received 11.0% and the British National Party received 14.2%.

Percentage changes are since June 2009, when the British National Party and the Green Party also stood, receiving 6.1% and 8.2%, respectively, of votes cast.

Percentage changes are since June 2009. At the previous election, the British National Party received 7.8% of the votes cast

Percentage changes are since June 2009. At the previous election, British National Party received 6.2%.

2013–2017

2017–2021

2021–2025

References

Essex election results
By-election results

External links 
Elections on the Essex County Council website

 
Council elections in Essex
County council elections in England